Samuel Jones (June 24, 1933 – December 30, 2021) was an American professional basketball player who was a shooting guard for the Boston Celtics in the National Basketball Association (NBA). A five-time NBA All-Star, he was known for his quickness and game-winning shots, especially during the NBA playoffs. Jones has the second most NBA championships of any player (10), behind only his teammate Bill Russell (11). He was also one of only three Celtics (along with teammates Russell and K. C. Jones) to be part of each of the Celtics' eight consecutive championships from 1959 to 1966.  Jones is a member of the Naismith Memorial Basketball Hall of Fame.

Early life
Sam Jones was born in Wilmington, North Carolina, on June 24, 1933.  He attended Laurinburg Institute, before studying at North Carolina Central University (then North Carolina College).  There, he was a four-year letterwinner for Hall of Fame coach John McLendon and coach Floyd Brown.  Jones scored 1,745 points and was a three-time All-CIAA league selection.  His number 41 was later retired by the Eagles.  He also served in the United States Army for two years.  He was intending to become a teacher after graduating.

Playing career
Jones was originally drafted by the Minneapolis Lakers as the eighth pick of the 1956 NBA draft.  However, he opted to return to college to earn his degree upon completion of military service, and therefore voided the Lakers' rights to him under NBA rules.  Boston Celtics Hall of Fame coach Red Auerbach subsequently took a trip south to scout North Carolina players who had just won the national championship.  Former Wake Forest coach Bones McKinney told Auerbach he could visit Chapel Hill, but the best player in the state was a few miles away.  Eventually, the Philadelphia Warriors selected North Carolina's Lennie Rosenbluth with the sixth pick of the 1957 NBA draft.  Boston selected Jones two picks later, even though Auerbach had never seen Jones play.

Jones made his NBA debut on October 22, 1957, recording one rebound in three minutes played against the St. Louis Hawks. He was a reserve for a number of seasons before replacing Bill Sharman as a starter.

Jones was one of only six Boston Celtics to have ever scored 50 points in an NBA game. At the time of his death in 2021, he owned Boston's sixth-best single-game scoring output (51 points vs. Detroit Pistons on October 29, 1965).  He also recorded 22 points and 5 rebounds in Game 7 of the 1966 NBA Finals as the Celtics won their eighth straight NBA Finals.  Jones ultimately played twelve seasons in the NBA with the Celtics, scoring 15,411 points to go along with 2,209 assists and 4,305 rebounds.  He was the franchise's career scoring leader at the time of his retirement in 1969.

Coaching career
After retiring from basketball, Jones coached at Federal City College (now known as University of the District of Columbia) from 1969 to 1973 and at North Carolina Central University, his alma mater, in 1973–74. He was an assistant coach for the New Orleans Jazz in 1974–75.

Player profile
Jones was known as a clutch scorer.  He participated in five All-Star Games, and is usually recognized as having been one of the best shooting guards of his generation.  Jones was named to the All-NBA Second Team three straight years (1965–67) and he played on 10 championship teams (1959–66 and 1968–69) — a total exceeded only by teammate Bill Russell in NBA history.

Jones' perfect form when shooting a jump shot, along with his great clutch shooting, led opponents to nickname him "The Shooter."  He was particularly adept at shooting the bank shot, in which the shooter bounces the ball off the backboard en route to the basket.  Many coaches, including UCLA's great John Wooden, believe that when a shooter is at a 20- to 50-degree angle to the backboard and inside 15 feet, a bank shot is always the preferred shot.  At 6-foot-4, Jones was the prototype of the tall guard who could run the floor and bang the boards, and had a rangy offensive game that gave opponents fits.  One of the "Jones Boys" in Boston, Sam teamed with K. C. Jones in the Celtics' backcourt to create havoc in NBA arenas around the country.

Jones led Boston in scoring five times, and he averaged 20 points or better in four consecutive seasons (1965–1968).  He scored 2,909 points in 154 playoff games (18.89 PPG), 92nd best in history as of the 2021 postseason.

Honors
Jones was inducted into the NAIA Basketball Hall of Fame in 1962.  Seven years later, he was inducted into the North Carolina Sports Hall of Fame—the first African-American thus honored.  Jones was named to the Naismith Memorial Basketball Hall of Fame in 1984.  He was named to the NBA 25th Anniversary Team (1971), as one of the 50 Greatest Players in NBA History (1996), and the NBA 75th Anniversary Team (2021).  He was part of the inaugural class inducted into the American Basketball Hall of Fame in 2019.
In the 2021-2022 NBA season, the Boston Celtics wore a black band with the number 24 on their jersey, to honor Jones who died that year.

Personal life
Jones was married to Gladys Chavis until her death in 2018.  Together, they had five children.  He lived for several decades in Silver Spring, Maryland, during which time he often served as a substitute teacher in the Montgomery County public school system.  He resided in St. Augustine, Florida, in retirement.

Jones died on the evening of December 30, 2021, in Boca Raton, Florida.  He was 88 years old.

NBA career statistics

Regular season

Playoffs

See also
 List of National Basketball Association players with 50 or more points in a playoff game
 List of NBA players with most championships
 List of NBA players who have spent their entire career with one franchise

References

External links

 Sam Jones—Hoophall Biography

1933 births
2021 deaths
20th-century African-American sportspeople
21st-century African-American people
African-American basketball players
American men's basketball players
Basketball coaches from North Carolina
Basketball players from North Carolina
Boston Celtics draft picks
Boston Celtics players
College men's basketball head coaches in the United States
Minneapolis Lakers draft picks
Naismith Memorial Basketball Hall of Fame inductees
National Basketball Association All-Stars
National Basketball Association players with retired numbers
North Carolina Central Eagles men's basketball coaches
North Carolina Central Eagles men's basketball players
Shooting guards
Sportspeople from Wilmington, North Carolina